Elections were held in the Australian state of Queensland between 10 March 1896 and 11 April 1896 to elect the members of the state's Legislative Assembly.

Key dates
Due to problems of distance and communications, it was not possible to hold the elections on a single day.

Results

|}

See also
 Members of the Queensland Legislative Assembly, 1896–1899

References

Elections in Queensland
1896 elections in Australia
1890s in Queensland
March 1896 events
April 1896 events